German submarine U-508 was a Type IXC U-boat of Nazi Germany's Kriegsmarine during World War II.

She was laid down at the Deutsche Werft yard in Hamburg as yard number 304 on 24 September 1940, launched on 30 July 1941 and commissioned on 20 October with Oberleutnant zur See Georg Staats in command.

U-508 began her service career with training as part of the 4th U-boat Flotilla from 20 October 1941. She was reassigned to the 10th flotilla for operations on 1 July 1942.

She carried out six patrols and sank 14 ships. She was sunk by an American aircraft on 12 November 1943.

Design
German Type IXC submarines were slightly larger than the original Type IXBs. U-508 had a displacement of  when at the surface and  while submerged. She had two shafts and two  propellers.

U-508 was fitted with six  torpedo tubes (four fitted at the bow and two at the stern), 22 torpedoes, one  SK C/32 naval gun, 180 rounds, and a  SK C/30 as well as a  C/30 anti-aircraft gun. The boat had a complement of forty-eight.

Service history

First patrol
The boat departed Kiel on 30 July 1942, moved through the North Sea and negotiated the 'gap' between Iceland and the Faroe Islands. She sailed close to the west coast of Ireland in a southerly direction, then turned southwest toward Cuba.

She sank the Manzanillo on 12 August 1942 in the Straits of Florida.

She entered Lorient, on the French Atlantic coast, (which was to be her base for most of the rest of her career), on 15 September 1942.

Second patrol
U-508s second foray took her to the waters off South America. The pickings were rich. This sortie, while not the boat's longest, was her most successful. Some, but not all of her victims are shown below:

She sank the City of Corinth north of Trinidad on 17 November 1942.

She went on to sink the Solon II on 3 December northeast of Georgetown, British Guiana. The ship went down in twenty seconds.

The Nigerian, which was sunk on 9 December, had among her passengers, four British Army officers. They were taken prisoner and landed at Lorient on the submarine's return.

Third, fourth and fifth patrols
On her third patrol, the boat was attacked by a British B-24 Liberator of No. 224 Squadron RAF and seriously damaged.

Her fourth sortie was relatively uneventful and short, lasting just three days.

Patrol number five, at 100 days the longest, saw the U-boat steam as far as the west African coast. In the Gulf of Guinea, she sank the Manchester Citizen on 9 July 1943. She returned to Lorient on 14 September.

Sixth patrol and loss
Having moved from Lorient to St. Nazaire, U-508 departed for her sixth and what turned out to be her final patrol on 9 November. On the 12th, while still on the outward leg, she was sunk by a US Navy PB4Y-1 Liberator of VB-103 in the Bay of Biscay.

Fifty-seven men died; there were no survivors.

Summary of raiding history

References

Bibliography

External links
 

German Type IX submarines
U-boats commissioned in 1941
U-boats sunk in 1942
World War II submarines of Germany
1941 ships
World War II shipwrecks in the Atlantic Ocean
Ships built in Hamburg
U-boats sunk by US aircraft
Ships lost with all hands
Maritime incidents in November 1943